At the 1906 Summer Olympics in Athens, four gymnastics events were contested, all for men only.   Now called the Intercalated Games, the 1906 Games are no longer considered as an official Olympic Games by the International Olympic Committee.

Medal summary

Medal table

References

External links
 databaseOlympics
 De Wael 

1906 Intercalated Games events
1906
1906 in gymnastics